The 2011 British Indoor Athletics Championships was the 5th edition of the national championship in indoor track and field for the United Kingdom. It was held from 12–13 February 2011 at the English Institute of Sport, Sheffield, England. A total of 24 events (divided evenly between the sexes) were contested over the two-day competition.

Guest athlete Livia Burri set a Swiss indoor record of 9:24.40 while finishing fifth in the women's 3000 m.

Results

Men

Women

References 

 Dwain Chambers flies to European-leading 60m in 6.57; Williams claims women's 60m win. European Athletics (2011-02-13). Retrieved 2019-07-14.
Brown, Matthew (2011-02-13). Chambers takes fourth 60m title, teenager Williams takes her first - UK indoor championships wrap. IAAF. Retrieved 2019-07-14.

British Indoor Championships
British Indoor Athletics Championships
Sports competitions in Sheffield
Athletics Indoor
Athletics competitions in England
February 2011 sports events in the United Kingdom